Qanat-e Now or Qanat Now or Qanat-i-Nau may refer to:
 Qanat-e Now, Khorrambid, Fars Province
 Qanat-e Now, Khorrami, Khorrambid County, Fars Province
 Qanat-e Now, Anbarabad, Kerman Province
 Qanat-e Now, Esmaili, Anbarabad County, Kerman Province
 Qanat-e Now, Jiroft, Kerman Province